Brahampur Assembly Constituency is an assembly Legislative constituency in Buxar district in the Indian state of Bihar. It is a part of the Buxar Lok Sabha (parliamentary) constituency of the state. As recommended by the Delimitation Commission of India in 2008, the Brahampur legislative assembly segment comprises Simri, Chakki and Brahampur community development blocks.

Members of the Legislative Assembly
Below is a year-wise list of the MLAs of Brahampur Legislative Assembly Constituency along with their party names till date:

Election results

2020

2015

See also 

Brahmapur, Bihar

References

External links
 
 

Assembly constituencies of Bihar
Politics of Buxar district